Futsal in Scotland has been played in Perth since 1997.

The first league had 4 teams and it went from strength to strength.

In 1999 Youth Futsal coaching started in Perth under the auspices of the now-defunct Scottish Futsal Federation and was headed by Steve Chatila, one of the 3 people running SFF. The coaching sessions were initially formed so as to ensure a conveyor belt supply of young players into the adult league in Perth, after it was analysed that implementing this would ensure the long-term survival of the adult league.

In 2000 Mark Potter formed the Scottish Futsal League.

In late 2001 there was a parting of the ways as the SFF split into 2 sections, Adult & Youth with Steve Chatila and Scott Robertson leaving the SFF to take youth Futsal side in a new direction, and Mark Potter taking on the Adult side.

In 2001 the SFL was the first officially recognised Futsal League in Scotland (based in Perth) – by the Scottish Amateur FA – in 2001 with Chair Mark Potter

27 December 2001

The SFA today became the first of the British associations to give formal recognition to Futsal, the regulated version of five-a-side football.

At a tournament in Perth, SFA Chief Executive David Taylor and Football Development Director Craig Brown were on hand to demonstrate the skills of futsal, which is a form of football now recognised and regulated by FIFA and UEFA.

Following the demonstration at the Bells Sports Centre, the SFA hopes that futsal will become popular in Scotland, with the prospect of international competitions in the future.

Now the game is set to develop in Scotland and the SFA was the first of the four British associations to give official recognition to this five-a-side version of football. Futsal is an internationally recognised sport, governed by FIFA and UEFA.

Perth is now the oldest continuously running Futsal League in the United Kingdom which was created by Mark Potter and Stephen Chatila + one other.

In 2005 the Scottish Futsal League joined up with the Futsal Premier League to help promote Futsal across the UK.

The Futsal Premier League (FPL) initiated a regional league in Edinburgh in November 2005. The Scottish National Futsal League, FPL Scotland, followed in 2006.[3] FPL Scotland is sponsored by Tennent's, who have given away over 50,000 futsal balls, and now also sponsor the National Football Team. Additional support came from the Scottish Football Association and kit manufacturer Joma. The FPL Scotland is divided into three Series, A, B and C, as opposed to two in England. Winners of the FPL Scotland Serie A progress to the UEFA Futsal Cup

In 2006, eight teams played in the first FPL Scotland Serie A:

Aberdeen Cosmos Dundee Dynamos Edinburgh United Fair City Santos(Perth) Glasgow City Glasgow Maccabi Inverness Wanderers Perth North Muirton

Fair City Santos, Scotland's first UEFA Futsal Entrants played in the first preliminary round of the UEFA Futsal Cup, against Adana from Armenia, Futsal Mad Max from Finland, and Roubaix from France, although they failed to progress to the next stage

Since 2006 the League Champions side has played in UEFA Futsal Cup.

In 2008 the Scottish Futsal League parted ways with the Futsal Premier League.

In 2014 New structure created in partnership with the SFA and SAFA in 2014 with new regional leagues formed (Aberdeen, Dundee, Edinburgh, Glasgow and Stirling in addition to the long-running Perth league).

2014/15 held first finals weekend where each regional winner competed over 3 days in a mini league to declare the Scottish champions - Fair City Santos

In 2014 saw the creation of the first Scotland National Futsal team with Mark Potter as its first head coach.

In 2015 Scotland National Futsal Team played in the UEFA Futsal Euros Preliminary Round held in Sweden.

2015/16 second year of finals weekend with a new champion declared for the first time outside of Perth - Wattcell of SFL Edinburgh.

2016 saw the Launch of a new national Scottish Cup won by Fair City Santos.

2016 under head coach Mark Potter, Scotland National Futsal team played in the first Home nations futsal tournament held in Wales.

2016/17 launch of the first ever national league held over 12 weeks in one venue. Winners TMT of SFL Glasgow

2017 Scotland National Futsal team played in the UEFA Futsal Euros preliminary round in Georgia

2017 under interim head coach Gerry Mcmonagle, Scotland National Futsal team played in Home nations futsal tournament held in Edinburgh Scotland.

2017/18 launch of the SFL 'Super League' as standalone league comprising 10 clubs.

2018 under new head coach Scott Chaplain, Scotland National Futsal team played in Home nations futsal tournament held in Northern Ireland.

2019 under new head coach Scott Chaplain, Scotland National Futsal team played in the FIFA Futsal World Cup Preliminary Round in Bosnia and Herzegovina

To date, there is no youth futsal league (hopefully this will change)

Current Adult League

Season 2018/19

SFL Superleague

Current Champions - Wattcell

Venues

University of Highlands and Islands - Perth College - Academy of Sport and Wellbeing
Ally McCoist Complex - East Kilbride
Dundee International Sport Centre
The Peak - Stirling

Superleague teams

Wattcell Futsal Club
Fair City Santos 
Polonia Dundee
Five Cities
Polonia Edinburgh
Dundee Futsal
Glasgow City FS
University of Edinburgh
PYF Saltires
TMT

SFL Regional Leagues

SFL-Dundee

Current Champions - Dundee West

Venues - Dundee International Sport Centre & Lynch Centre

SFL-Dundee Teams

Dundee West
Dundee West FD
Montrose
Dryburgh
Dundee City
Dundee Stars
Dundee Celtic
Dundee University
St Andrews University

SFL-Edinburgh

Current Champions - Wattcell Boca

Venues
ORIAM
Tynecastle High School

Championship Division

Phoenix Edinburgh
Galacticos
Nerazuri
Lothian Balompie
Edinburgh Deaf
RMT Sacachipas
Corstorphine Dynamo
Dalkeith Thistle
Informatics

Development Division

Wattcell Boca
Polonia Edinburgh B
University of Edinburgh B
Dalkeith Cardo
UofE Boteco do Brasil
Nerazuri B

SFL-Perth

Current Champions - Zenit St Johnstoun

Venue - Bells Sport Centre

SFL-Perth Teams

Oakbank Santos
PYF Academy
Zenit St. Johnstoun FC
Real Perth Futsal
PYF Development
AC Perth
Letham Santos
Breadalbane
The Old Lady
Cherrybank
Body Academy

SFL-Glasgow

Current Champions - Glasgow City FS

Venues
Hutcheson Grammar 
City of Glasgow College

SFL-Glasgow Teams

TMT B
Glasgow City B
Edusport Futsal
Cardo Club De Futsal
St Vincent Deaf
Strathclyde Futsal
Whitletts Victoria
Glasgow Deaf
Persian Athletic
TCB Futsal
Glasgow Futsal
City of Glasgow College
TJ Slovak Lads
Lanarkshire Deaf

References

External links
Scottish Futsal League